Midshipman Jack is a 1933 American pre-Code action film directed by Christy Cabanne and written by Frank Wead and F. McGrew Willis. The film stars Bruce Cabot, Betty Furness, Frank Albertson, Arthur Lake, and Florence Lake. The film was released on September 22, 1933, by RKO Pictures.

Plot

Cast
Bruce Cabot as Jack Austin
Betty Furness as Ruth Rogers
Frank Albertson as Russell H. Burns
Arthur Lake as Allen S. Williams
Florence Lake as Sally Withers
John Darrow as Clark Simpson
Purnell Pratt as Captain Rogers
Margaret Seddon as Mrs. Burns

References

External links 

1933 films
American black-and-white films
RKO Pictures films
Films directed by Christy Cabanne
American action adventure films
1930s action adventure films
1930s English-language films
1930s American films